The Walter Taylor Ward is a ward of the  Brisbane City Council in Queensland, Australia. It covers Fig Tree Pocket, Indooroopilly, St Lucia, and parts of Chapel Hill, Taringa and Toowong.

Councillors for Walter Taylor Ward

Results

References 

City of Brisbane wards